Odacantha is a genus of ground beetle native to the Palearctic (including Europe) and the Near East. It contains the following species:

 Odacantha aegrota Bates, 1883
 Odacantha chinensis Jedlicka, 1963
 Odacantha composita Liebke, 1938 
 Odacantha cyanea Laferte-Senectere, 1849 
 Odacantha flavipennis Liebke, 1931 
 Odacantha hagai Nemoto, 1989
 Odacantha insulicola Basilewsky, 1977 
 Odacantha laportei Chaudoir, 1848 
 Odacantha melanura (Linnaeus, 1767) 
 Odacantha metallica Fairmaire, 1889 
 Odacantha pomposa Liebke, 1933 
 Odacantha puziloi Solsky, 1875 
 Odacantha seriepunctata Chaudoir, 1878 
 Odacantha subcomposita Basilewsky, 1970 
 Odacantha swazina Basilewsky, 1965

References

External links
Odacantha at Fauna Europaea

Lebiinae